This article contains the most popular Hungarian commercial television channels and other stations.

TV2

RTL Klub

Viasat 3

Cool TV

See also
 Media of Hungary

Lists of television series by country of production

 
Series